Barnoldswick is a civil parish in Pendle, Lancashire, England.  It contains 27 listed buildings that are recorded in the National Heritage List for England.  Of these, one is listed at Grade I, the highest of the three grades, two are at Grade II*, the middle grade, and the others are at Grade II, the lowest grade.

The parish contains the town of Barnoldswick and surrounding countryside.  Most of the listed buildings are houses, farmhouses, and farm buildings, some of which have been absorbed by the expanding town. The Leeds and Liverpool Canal runs through the parish, and bridges and locks associated with it are listed.  The other listed buildings include churches and an associated structures, a public house, and a milestone.

Key

Buildings

References

Citations

Sources

Lists of listed buildings in Lancashire
Buildings and structures in the Borough of Pendle